Barbet may refer to:
 Barbet (dog), a dog breed
 Various birds in the infraorder Ramphastides
 African barbet, part of the bird family Lybiidae
 New World barbet, the bird family Capitonidae
 Asian barbet, the bird family Megalaimidae
 Toucan-barbet, the bird family Semnornithidae
 USS Barbet (AMc-38), a coastal minesweeper commissioned on 29 September 1941
 USS Barbet (AMS-41), a minesweeper commissioned on 8 June 1942
Barbet (surname)

See also
Barbette (disambiguation)
Barbetta, Italian restaurant in New York City